Jeffrey Owen Katz (born 1950) is an American scientist best known for his pivotal contribution to the field of factor analysis and his development of innovative AI (artificial intelligence) tools.  Born April 6, 1950, he is the only child of Nathan Katz (accountant) and Rosalyn Anker (talent agent, entertainer, lapidary shop owner, and founder of Animals in Distress).  He grew up in Queens, New York, but moved with his family to Merrick, N.Y. in 1962.  He was a recognized child prodigy in electronic engineering, able to read and draw schematic diagrams before he could read and write English.  Rather than send their only child away to a boarding school for gifted children, his parents arranged for home-schooling, which was continued until Katz' mid-teens when he began auditing college level courses at local universities.

Education
Eventually Katz enrolled in undergraduate studies at Stony Brook University, part of the State University of New York.  Katz rapidly advanced through mathematics, psychology, psychophysiology, physics, and biology.  As a graduate student in mathematics at Stony Brook University, he published a new method of factor rotation, programmed (in Fortran) a portion of the Numerical Taxonomy Systems Package, and published a number of papers in refereed journals.

In the mid-1970s, Katz was invited to enroll at the University of Lancaster in England, where his academic interests and expertise coalesced in the application of mathematics and psychometrics to the study of psychophysiology and genetics via sophisticated instrumentation which he designed and built.  Katz's graduate studies were interrupted by an extended critical illness during which time he returned to his family home in the U.S.  In 1983, Katz received a Ph.D. from the University of Lancaster, England, under the mentorship of both Phillip Levy, Chair of Lancaster's Psychology Department, and Hans Eysenck, psychometrician and founder of the Psychology Department at the University of London.  Despite the offer of a teaching and research position in Dr. Eysenck's department, after graduation Katz returned to Long Island to be close to his family.

Research
After graduation, Katz held several research positions.  He worked for the Brain Research Laboratories (New York University) developing neurometric systems based on the multivariate statistical analysis of electroencephalographic signals (EEG).  He later worked for HeartMap, a biomedical company, where he headed the design, hardware prototyping, software development and testing of a 64-channel cardiac monitor with special analytic capabilities, including neural network pattern recognition and the ability to generate 3-D images of the electrical potentials across the surface of the heart.  He also worked for the American Society for Psychical Research. where he developed experimental protocols, conducted data analysis, as well as designed and built low noise instrumentation for a variety of psycho physiological and physical experiments.

In 1989, Katz founded and became CEO of Scientific Consultant Services, Inc. (www.scientific-consultants.com), a firm that provides advanced solutions to difficult data handling problems in diverse fields.  To that end, he developed sophisticated artificial intelligence software (neural networks and genetic algorithms).  His clients have ranged from the U.S. Navy to the Swedish Lumber Authority; major asset management firms to individual investors.   His accomplishments include the development of the first commercially available neural network model that forecasts the date, direction and degree of S&P 500 and OEX turning points from one day to months in advance (NexTurn); the development of the first 32-bit neural network development tool for PCs (N-Train); and the development of the first neurogenetic development tool, designed for the genetic evolution of neural networks (LogiVolve).

In addition, Katz served as Managing Principal and Director of Trading and System Development of Blackhorn Asset Management, LLC (2005–2008); Technical Director of Interactive Software Laboratories, Inc. (1995–1998), a firm offering data, data management tools and predictive software to the financial community; and Co-Founder, Vice President, and Director of Software Development, Datatek, Inc. (1990–1993), a consulting and trading system development firm.

Throughout his life, Katz has given generously of his time and resources to various nonprofit causes, ranging from animal welfare to science education.  He has lectured and taught classes at all levels of academia and at private organizations, has published extensively in several fields (in refereed journals, trade magazines, anthologies) and, with his wife, co-authored three books for McGraw-Hill

Astronomy and Custer Institute
From 2003-2013, Katz devoted substantial time to one of his main passions: science education.  During that period, he established research and internship programs at the Custer Institute, Inc., where he also served on the Board of Directors (2003–2013), as Observatory Director (2004–2012), and as Research Chair (2006–2012). He was the founder and coordinator of the Custer Institute's “Education Through Research” Program, and served as mentor for students from high school through graduate school, often helping them achieve grants and competitive awards. To help promote the Institute and its programs, for several years Katz wrote a monthly astronomy column for the Long Island Pulse magazine, and was featured in numerous media productions, including the PBS award-winning documentary, "The Souls of New York." To facilitate the work of the Institute, he obtained grants for its research and educational programs, enlisted the participation of many local scientists and academicians, and developed specialized hardware (e.g., optics innovations) and software (e.g., a unique deconvolution algorithm for image enhancement). In acknowledgment of his accomplishments, he was awarded a Citation from the New York State Assembly.  Katz is currently on the Advisory Board of Montauk Observatory, Inc.

While at the Custer Institute, Katz's childhood interest in amateur radio resurfaced.  He revitalized the Institute's amateur radio and radio astronomy programs and was pivotal in arranging the donation and installation of a 55-foot crank-up radio tower from the Great South Bay Amateur Radio Club (of which he is still a member).

Katz's latest research endeavor is the development of a multi-schedule survey of symptomatology and treatment of fibromyalgia and chronic fatigue syndrome.  Nearly 5000 respondents have participated in this study, which revealed important correlations between a number of factors, including the relationship between thyroid conditions and these disorders.  Katz is currently working on a publication about this study and the results.

Publications
 Katz, Jeffrey Owen. "Star Gazer." Monthly column on astronomy published in Long Island Pulse magazine, 20072012.
 Katz, Jeffrey Owen (April 1992). "Developing Neural Network Forecasters for Trading." Technical Analysis of Stocks and Commodities, pp. 58–68.
 Katz, Jeffrey Owen. Personal construct theory and the emotions: An interpretation in terms of primitive constructs. British Journal of Psychology, 1984, (75), pp. 315–327.
 Katz, Jeffrey Owen. An introduction to constructtheoretic psychology. Journal of Perceptual and Motor Skills, 1983 (37), pp. 983–999.
 Katz, Jeffrey Owen. Psi sources and brain events: An examination of cortical evoked potentials at the moment of observation in a Schmidtian PK task. Research in Parapsychology, 1982, pp. 218–221.
 Katz, Jeffrey Owen. An empirical study of the genetic selection of psychological characteristics in man. MENSA Research Journal, Winter 1978, Vol. 7, No. 1, pp. 47–59.
 Katz, Jeffrey Owen, and McCormick, Donna L. Advanced Option Pricing Models: An Empirical Approach to Valuing Options. McGraw Hill, March 2005.
 Katz, Jeffrey Owen, and McCormick, Donna L. (February 2002). "Trading Options with Finesse." Futures, Vol. 31, No. 3, pp. 42–46.
 Katz, Jeffrey Owen, and McCormick, Donna L. How to Start Day Trading Futures, Options, and Indices. McGraw Hill, October 2001.
 Katz, Jeffrey Owen, and McCormick, Donna L. (June 2001c). "More Intelligent Option Pricing." Futures, Vol. 30, No. 7, pp. 42–45.
 Katz, Jeffrey Owen, and McCormick, Donna L. (May 2001b). "Market Realities and Options Pricing." Futures, Vol. 30, No. 6, pp. 38–40.
 Katz, Jeffrey Owen, and McCormick, Donna L. The Encyclopedia of Trading Strategies. McGraw Hill, Spring 2000.
 Katz, Jeffrey Owen, and McCormick, Donna L. "Case Study: Building An Advanced Trading System." In Computerized Trading, Mark Jurik, Editor. Prentice Hall, 1999.
 Katz, Jeffrey Owen, and McCormick, Donna L. (February 1999). "Trading Stocks with a Cyclical System." Technical Analysis of Stocks and Commodities, pp. 36–42.
 Katz, Jeffrey Owen, and McCormick, Donna L. (July 1998). "Barrier Stops and Trendlines." Technical Analysis of Stocks and Commodities, pp. 44–49.
 Katz, Jeffrey Owen, and McCormick, Donna L. (May 1998). "Using Barrier Stops in Exit Strategies." Technical Analysis of Stocks and Commodities, pp. 63–89.
 Katz, Jeffrey Owen, and McCormick, Donna L. (April 1998). "Using Trailing Stops in Exit Strategies." Technical Analysis of Stocks and Commodities, pp. 86–92.
 Katz, Jeffrey Owen, and McCormick, Donna L. (March 1998). "Testing Exit Strategies." Technical Analysis of Stocks and Commodities, pp. 35–42.
 Katz, Jeffrey Owen, and McCormick, Donna L. (February 1998). "Exits, Stops and Strategy." Technical Analysis of Stocks and Commodities, pp. 32–40.
 Katz, Jeffrey Owen, and McCormick, Donna L. (November 1997). "Adding the Human Element to Neural Nets." Technical Analysis of Stocks and Commodities, pp. 52–64.
 Katz, Jeffrey Owen, and McCormick, Donna L. (September 1997). "Sunspots and Market Activity." Technical Analysis of Stocks and Commodities, pp. 46–54.
 Katz, Jeffrey Owen, and McCormick, Donna L. (August 1997). "Using Statistics with Trading Systems." Technical Analysis of Stocks and Commodities, pp. 32–38.
 Katz, Jeffrey Owen, and McCormick, Donna L. (July 1997). "Evaluating Trading Systems with Statistics." Technical Analysis of Stocks and Commodities, pp. 50–61.
 Katz, Jeffrey Owen, and McCormick, Donna L. (June 1997). "Lunar Cycles and Trading." Technical Analysis of Stocks and Commodities, pp. 38–46.
 Katz, Jeffrey Owen, and McCormick, Donna L. (May 1997). "Cycles and Trading Systems." Technical Analysis of Stocks and Commodities, pp. 38–46.
 Katz, Jeffrey Owen, and McCormick, Donna L. (April 1997). "Seasonality and Trading." Technical Analysis of Stocks and Commodities, pp. 50–61.
 Katz, Jeffrey Owen, and McCormick, Donna L. (February 1997). "Genetic Algorithms and RuleBased Systems." Technical Analysis of Stocks and Commodities, pp. 46–60.
 Katz, Jeffrey Owen, and McCormick, Donna L. (December 1996). "A RuleBased Approach to Trading." Technical Analysis of Stocks and Commodities, pp. 22–3
 Katz, Jeffrey Owen, and McCormick, Donna L. (January 1997). "Developing Systems with a Rule Based Approach." Technical Analysis of Stocks and Commodities, pp. 38–52.
 Katz, Jeffrey Owen, and McCormick, Donna L. (November 1996). "On Developing Trading Systems." Technical Analysis of Stocks and Commodities, pp. 46–60.
 Katz, Jeffrey Owen, and McCormick, Donna L. "Introduction to Artificial Intelligence: Basics of Expert Systems, Fuzzy Logic, Neural Networks, and Genetic Algorithms." In Virtual Trading, Jess Lederman and Robert Klein, Editors. Probus Publishing, 1995.
 Katz, Jeffrey Owen, and McCormick, Donna L. "Neural Networks in Trading." In Virtual Trading, Jess Lederman and Robert Klein, Editors. Probus Publishing, 1995.
 Katz, Jeffrey Owen, and McCormick, Donna L. (1994). "Neural Networks: Some Advice to Beginners." Trader's Catalog and Resource Guide, Vol. II, No. 4, p. 36.
 Katz, Jeffrey Owen, and McCormick, Donna L. (July/August 1994). "Neurogenetics and Its Use in Trading System Development." NeuroVe$t Journal, pp. 8–11.
 Katz, Jeffrey Owen, and McCormick, Donna L. (March/April 1993). "Vendor's Forum: The Evolution of NTRAIN." PCAI, pp. 44–46.
 Katz, Jeffrey Owen, and Rohlf, F. James. Primary product functionplane: An oblique rotation to simple structure. Multivariate Behavioral Research, April 1975, Vol. 10, pp. 219–232.
 Katz, Jeffrey Owen, and Rohlf, F. James. Functionplane: A new approach to simple structure rotation. Psychometrika, March 1974, Vol. 39, No. 1, pp. 37–51.
 Katz, Jeffrey Owen, and Rohlf, F. James. Functionpoint cluster analysis. Systematic Zoology, September 1973, Vol. 22, No. 3, pp. 295–301.

Personal life
Katz is fluent in written and spoken Spanish, enjoys music ranging from early 20th century jazz to heavy metal, is an avid amateur astronomer, and holds an Extra Class amateur radio license (AC2BQ).

Katz currently lives in Selden, New York, with his wife, Donna L. McCormick (married in 2009).

References

External links

American astronomers
20th-century American writers
People from Brookhaven, New York
People from Suffolk County, New York
1950 births
Living people
Parapsychologists
Scientists from New York (state)